Dayrestan (also Romanized as Dayrestān) is a village in Suza Rural District, Shahab District, Qeshm County, Hormozgan Province, Iran. At the 2006 census, its population was 1,453, in 294 families.  The village suffered heavily in the 2005 Qeshm earthquake.

References 

Populated places in Qeshm County